Charles Levi Walker  (November 2, 1926 – September 12, 2008) was an American country musician. His biggest success was with the song, "Pick Me Up on Your Way Down".

He held membership in the Grand Ole Opry from 1967, and was inducted into the Country Radio DJ Hall of Fame in 1981.

Career
He was born in Copeville, Texas, United States. In 1943, Walker joined Bill Boyd's Cowboy Ramblers, and during World War II, he served as a disc jockey for the Armed Forces Radio Network.

Walker worked as a disc jockey in from 1951 until 1961 at KMAC and then from 1961 up to 1963 at KENS in San Antonio, Texas, before signing with Decca Records. His first hit, "Only You, Only You" was co-written with Jack Newman and reached No. 9 on the country chart in January 1956. Walker later signed with Columbia Records and reached No. 2 with a Harlan Howard song, "Pick Me Up on Your Way Down". His other hits include "Who Will Buy the Wine", "Wild as a Wildcat", "Don't Squeeze My Sharmon", and "I Wouldn't Take Her To A Dogfight." Many of his records featured harmony vocals by Ray Price. His more popular recordings were of honky-tonk numbers, such as "Close All the Honky Tonks", and "Honky Tonk Women". Walker played a minor role in the 1985 Patsy Cline biographical film, Sweet Dreams.

Walker died of colon cancer in September 2008, at the age of 81 in Hendersonville, Tennessee.

Discography

Albums
{| class="wikitable"
! Year
! Album
! US Country
! Label
|-
| 1961
| Greatest Hits
| 
| Columbia
|-
| 1965
| Close All the Honky Tonks
| 
| rowspan="5"| Epic
|-
| rowspan="2"| 1966
| Born to Lose
| 
|-
| Wine, Women and Walker
| 
|-
| 1967
| Don't Squeeze My Sharmon
| align="center"| 16
|-
| rowspan="2"| 1968
| Greatest Hits
| 
|-
| Country Style
|
| rowspan="1"| Vocalion
|-
| rowspan="2"| 1969
| He Is My Everything
| 
| rowspan="3"| Epic
|-
| Recorded Live in Dallas, Texas
| 
|-
| 1971
| Honky Tonkin'''
| 
|-
| 1972
| I Don't Mind Goin' Under| 
| rowspan="2"| RCA Victor
|-
| 1973
| Break Out the Bottle / Bring On the Music| 
|-
| 1978
| Golden Hits| 
| rowspan="2"| Plantation
|-
| 1979
| Texas Gold| 
|}

Singles
{| class="wikitable"
! rowspan="2"| Year
! rowspan="2"| Single
! colspan="2"| Chart Positions
! rowspan="2"| Album
|-
! width="50"| US Country
! width="50"| CAN Country
|-
| rowspan="3"| 1952
| "I'm Looking for Another You"
| 
| 
| rowspan="13"| singles only
|-
| "Flaming Jewels"
| 
| 
|-
| "Out of My Arms"
| 
| 
|-
| rowspan="2"| 1953
| "Flock of Memories"
| 
| 
|-
| "Stay Away from My Heart"
| 
| 
|-
| rowspan="2"| 1954
| "Tell Her Lies and Feed Her Candy"
| 
| 
|-
| "When You Know You Have Lost"
| 
| 
|-
| 1955
| "Chocolate Song"
| 
| 
|-
| rowspan="2"| 1956
| "Only You, Only You"
| align="center"| 9
| 
|-
| "Stand Still"
| 
| 
|-
| rowspan="3"| 1957
| "Cheaters Never Win"
| 
| 
|-
| "Dancing Mexican Girl"
| 
| 
|-
| "Take My Hand"
| 
| 
|-
| 1958
| "Pick Me Up on Your Way Down"
| align="center"| 2
| 
| rowspan="6"| Greatest Hits|-
| rowspan="2"| 1959
| "I'll Catch You When You Fall"
| align="center"| 16
| 
|-
| "When My Conscience Hurts the Most"
| align="center"| 22
| 
|-
| 1960
| "Who Will Buy the Wine"
| align="center"| 11
| 
|-
| rowspan="3"| 1961
| "Facing the Wall"
| align="center"| 25
| 
|-
| "Right Back at Your Door"
| 
| 
|-
| "Louisiana Belle"
| 
| 
| rowspan="4"| singles only
|-
| rowspan="2"| 1962
| "Life Goes On (I Wonder Why)"
| 
| 
|-
| "One in Every Crowd"
| 
| 
|-
| 1963
| "That's Where Katie Waits"
| 
| 
|-
| 1964
| "Close All the Honky Tonks"
| align="center"| 17
| 
| rowspan="2"| Close All the Honky Tonks|-
| rowspan="2"| 1965
| "Pick Me Up on Your Way Down"
| 
| 
|-
| "Wild as a Wildcat"
| align="center"| 8
| 
| single only
|-
| rowspan="5"| 1966
| "He's a Jolly Good Fellow"
| align="center"| 39
| 
| rowspan="3"| Wine, Women and Walker|-
| "The Man in the Little White Suit"
| align="center"| 37
| 
|-
| "Little Old Wine Drinker"
| 
| 
|-
| "Daddy's Coming Home (Next Week)"
| align="center"| 56
| 
| rowspan="3"| singles only
|-
| "I'm Gonna Hang Up My Gloves"
| align="center"| 65
| 
|-
| rowspan="3"| 1967
| "The Town That Never Sleeps"
| align="center"| 38
| 
|-
| "Don't Squeeze My Sharmon"
| align="center"| 8
| 
| rowspan="2"| Don't Squeeze My Sharmon|-
| "I Wouldn't Take Her to a Dogfight"
| align="center"| 33
| 
|-
| rowspan="2"| 1968
| "Truck Drivin' Cat with Nine Wives"
| align="center"| 54
| 
| rowspan="2"| singles only
|-
| "San Diego"
| align="center"| 31
| align="center"| 28
|-
| rowspan="2"| 1969
| "Honky-Tonk Season"
| align="center"| 52
| 
| rowspan="2"| Recorded Live in Dallas, Texas|-
| "Moffett, Oklahoma"
| align="center"| 44
| 
|-
| rowspan="3"| 1970
| "Honky Tonk Women"
| align="center"| 56
| 
| rowspan="4"| Honky Tonkin'|-
| "Let's Go Fishin' Boys (The Girls Are Bitin')"
| align="center"| 52
| 
|-
| "God Save the Queen (Of the Honky Tonks)"
| 
| 
|-
| rowspan="2"| 1971
| "My Baby Used to Be That Way"
| align="center"| 71
| 
|-
| "Wild Women"
| 
| 
| single only
|-
| 1972
| "I Don't Mind Goin' Under (If It'll Get Me Over You)"
| align="center"| 74
| 
| I Don't Mind Goin' Under|-
| rowspan="2"| 1973
| "Soft Lips and Hard Liquor"
| align="center"| 65
| align="center"| 81
| rowspan="2"| Break Out the Bottle / Bring On the Music|-
| "Gonna Drink Milwaukee Dry"
| 
| 
|-
| rowspan="2"| 1974
| "Wanting My Women Again"
| 
| 
| rowspan="8"| singles only
|-
| "Odds and Ends (Bits and Pieces)"
| align="center"| 66
| 
|-
| 1975
| "Say You're Gone"
| 
| 
|-
| rowspan="2"| 1977
| "Deep Water"
| 
| 
|-
| "I've Had a Beautiful Time"
| 
| 
|-
| rowspan="3"| 1978
| "T for Texas"
| 
| 
|-
| "Red Skies Over Georgia"
| 
| 
|-
| "My Shoes Keep Walkin' Back to You"
| 
| 
|-
| 1979
| "Don't Sing a Song About Texas"
| 
| 
| Texas Gold|}

References

Bibliography
Pugh, Ronnie (1998). "Charlie Walker". In The Encyclopedia of Country Music''. Paul Kingsbury, Editor. New York: Oxford University Press. p. 567.

External links
Charlie Walker's Grand Ole Opry member page

1926 births
2008 deaths
People from Collin County, Texas
Grand Ole Opry members
American male singer-songwriters
American country singer-songwriters
Singer-songwriters from Texas
Deaths from colorectal cancer
Deaths from cancer in Tennessee
20th-century American singers
Country musicians from Texas
20th-century American male singers